Raphael Assibey-Mensah (born 31 August 1999) is a German professional footballer who plays as a left winger for FSV Zwickau. He is a product of the Mainz 05 academy and began his senior career with TSV Schott Mainz in 2018. He transferred to SC Freiburg II in 2021 and moved to FSV Zwickau in 2022.

Club career

Youth years 
A left winger or attacking midfielder, Assibey-Mensah began his career in his native Germany with Fontana Finthen, before entering the Mainz 05 academy. He progressed through the ranks to the club's U17 team and scored three goals in 14 U17 Bundesliga appearances before his release at the end of the 2015–16 season. Assibey-Mensah moved to England to sign his first professional contract to be a part of the B team at Championship club Brentford on 31 August 2016. He made 62 appearances and scored six goals before his release at the end of the 2017–18 season.

TSV Schott Mainz 
In mid-September 2018, Assibey-Mensah returned to Germany to join Oberliga Rheinland-Pfalz/Saar club TSV Schott Mainz on a contract running until the end of the 2018–19 season. During a season interrupted with a pulmonary embolism, he finished with 15 appearances and two goals. During the club's 2019–20 Oberliga Rheinland-Pfalz/Saar championship-winning season that was ended prematurely by the COVID-19 pandemic, Assibey-Mensah made 20 appearances and scored eight goals. He was retained for 2020–21 and scored 12 goals in 39 appearances during a Regionalliga Südwest season in which the club narrowly avoided relegation. Assibey-Mensah departed TSV Schott Mainz at the end of the campaign and made 74 appearances and scored 22 goals during his three-season spell with the club.

SC Freiburg II 
In May 2021, Assibey-Mensah agreed to transfer to newly-promoted 3. Liga club SC Freiburg II, on a contract effective 1 July 2021, for a €100,000 fee. During an illness-affected 2021–22 season, he made eight appearances without scoring. In June 2022, Assibey-Mensah joined Swiss Challenge League club FC Schaffhausen on trial, but did not win a contract. Assibey-Mensah departed the club on the penultimate day of the summer transfer window.

FSV Zwickau 
On 31 August 2022, Assibey-Mensah transferred to 3. Liga club FSV Zwickau and signed a one-year contract, with a one-year option.

International career 
Assibey-Mensah was named as a standby for a Germany U16 training camp in Barsinghausen in May 2015.

Personal life 
Assibey-Mensah is of Ghanaian descent.

Career statistics

Honours 
TSV Schott Mainz
 Oberliga Rheinland-Pfalz/Saar: 2019–20

References

External links 
 Raphael Assibey-Mensah at fsv05.de
 

Living people
1999 births
German sportspeople of Ghanaian descent
German footballers
Association football wingers
Association football midfielders
Footballers from Leipzig
3. Liga players
Regionalliga players
Brentford F.C. players
TSV Schott Mainz players
SC Freiburg II players
German expatriate footballers
German expatriate sportspeople in England
Expatriate footballers in England
FSV Zwickau players